Alcea biennis, the biennial hollyhock, is a species of Alcea in the mallow family, Malvaceae.

References

biennis